The 45th Army Corps was an Army corps in the Imperial Russian Army.

Part of
11th Army: 1916
9th Army: 1917
5th Army: 1917

References 

A. K. Zalesskij I mirowaja wojna. Prawitieli i wojennaczalniki. wyd. WECZE Moskwa 2000.

Corps of the Russian Empire